Tyrannodoris caboverdensis is a species  of sea slug, a polycerid nudibranch, a marine gastropod mollusc in the family Polyceridae.

Distribution
This species was described from the Cape Verde Islands.

Description
Tyrannodoris caboverdensis is a predominantly black animal with orange horizontal lines. It reaches approximately 70 mm in length. Like other nudibranchs in the genus Tyrannodoris, it is carnivorous, feeding on other seaslugs.

References

Polyceridae
Gastropods described in 2003